General Hong Yun-seong (1425–7 October 1475) was a Korean Joseon Dynasty politician and soldier. He was a member of the court of King Sejo, First and Second Vice Prime minister (also called Left and Right State Councillor, respectively) from 1467 to 1469, and Prime Minister (also called Chief State Councillor) from August 1469 to April 1470 .

His birth name was Useong (우성, 禹成), his pennames were Yeonghae (영해, 領海), Gyeonghae (경해, 傾海), and Gyeongeumdang (경음당, 鯨飮堂), and his Chinese style name was Suong (수옹 守翁).

Popular culture
 Portrayed by Yoo Sang-jae in 2013 film The Face Reader.

See also 

 Han Myung-hoi
 Shin Suk-ju
 Jeong In-ji
 Kwon Ram
 Seong Sam-mun
 Hong Dal-son

References

External links 
 britannica :Hong Yun-seong 
 Hong Yun-seong  
 조선을 망친 것은 공신들이었다 동아일보역사산책 - 이덕일 
 홍윤성 
 영의정을 노리는 홍윤성:JTBC 방송

1425 births
1475 deaths
Korean generals
Korean Confucianists
Korean revolutionaries
15th-century Korean philosophers
15th-century Korean poets